The Deutsch-Englische Gesellschaft (German-English Society) was the German sister organization of the Anglo-German Fellowship. The Dienststelle Ribbentrop was created by Joachim von Ribbentrop in 1935, and was to function parallel to the German foreign ministry. Using unconventional diplomacy, the Dienststelle was to sway British-German relations.

References

External links
 

1935 establishments in Germany
Germany–United Kingdom relations
Organizations established in 1935
United Kingdom friendship associations
Germany friendship associations
Organisations based in Berlin
Foreign relations of Nazi Germany